Ana Beatriz Francisco das Chagas also known as Bia (born October 18, 1971) is a Brazilian volleyball player. She is 179 cm and 62 kg.

She participated in the 2004 FIVB World Grand Prix,. and 2004 Summer Olympics.

She played for Sollo Tietê, BCN/Osasco, Mappin Pinheiros, Universidade de Guarulhos, Petrobrás/Força Olímpica, MRV Minas, Macaé Nuceng, BCN/Osasco and Finasa/Osasco  in Brazil, Fenerbahçe Acıbadem in Turkey, Ícaro Palma in Spain and now she currently plays for Mackenzie Cia do Terno.

Career

References

External links
 Player profile at fenerbahce.org

1971 births
Living people
Volleyball players from Rio de Janeiro (city)
Brazilian women's volleyball players
Fenerbahçe volleyballers
Outside hitters
Brazilian expatriate sportspeople in Turkey
Brazilian expatriate sportspeople in Spain
Expatriate volleyball players in Spain
Expatriate volleyball players in Turkey